is a series of science fiction novels first published in December 2004, published by Newmarket Press written by Tedd Anasti, Patsy Cameron-Anasti and Stephen D. Sullivan (books 2–3). The series was adapted into an anime series, produced by Bee Train and Cookie Jar Entertainment. It was the first show from the latter company that was placed under the control of their then-new action-adventure brand Coliseum.

Three novels for the series included Shards of the Oracle, Reign of the Soul Eater and Quest of the Earthen. The series was broadcast on Teletoon, This TV, and used to be broadcast on Kids' WB. Koichi Mashimo co-directed the staff at Bee Train with Takaaki Ishiyama. Writer Yosuke Kuroda adapted the novels. Robert Pincombe and Shelly Hoffman wrote the English version.

Plot
Eleven-year-old Hunter Steel searches for the legendary inner world by following instructions in his grandfather's journal. He enters a pyramid where he finds a mysterious manacle that attaches to his arm. A spider startles Hunter, who falls into a hole to the center of the Earth and into the subterranean world of Arachna. There, he discovers a small group of elite warriors struggling to survive and to save Arachna from the attack of Invectids, a race of insectoids. The warriors are children/teenagers, each fighting with the help of their own  battle spiders. They call themselves "Spider Riders". In the English TV series, the ages of the characters were reduced. There is a prophecy that says a surface-dweller or Human, like Hunter, will bring disaster to the Inner World. Sparkle mentions it at the beginning of the TV series. When Princess Sparkle finds out she says, "I wonder if he will bring doom to us...or to them."

Oracle Keys
The Oracle Keys are fractions of the Oracle's power. They are cards that can be split in two. The Invectids hope to gain them for Mantid, who wants to use their power to rule Arachna. The Oracle uses much of her strength to protect them. The Spirit Oracle Key passes its power onto Hunter and Shadow, giving them new armor and weapons as well as new abilities.

To activate the keys, the holder must shout "Oracle's Light!". Two in combination can create more powerful armor and weapons. The wielder must have a sincere desire to protect without arrogance, otherwise the keys will malfunction. The Oracle Key from Nuuma was called by Corona, using her power, to let Hunter use it without having to hold it. Mantid used two of the Oracle's keys to power himself, plunging the Inner World into darkness and preventing Hunter from using his own keys.

Currently, the locations of the four Oracle Keys are known in the English version:

 Found in the Oracle's shrine in Arachna, the first key is taken by Hunter and Shadow, who retain possession of it throughout the series.
 The second key is brought to Arachna by a page from Nuuma. Hunter and Shadow have it in their possession for most of the series, though it was briefly taken by Aqune and Portia.
 The third key is initially kept in a sanctuary in Nuuma and allows the castle to float in the sky via the Oracle's power. It is taken by Aqune for the Invectids, but ends up in the possession of Hunter and Shadow during the final battle against Mantid.
 The fourth key held by Mantid powers Castle Mantid and sustains Mantid throughout the series until he steals the Oracle's power and abandons it. It ends up in the possession of Hunter and Shadow during the final battle against Mantid.

Episodes

Characters

Broadcast history
The animated series debuted on March 25, 2006 on Teletoon in Canada. Kids WB! on The CW began airing it during the 2006-2007 season. The last Spider Riders episode was shown in Canada on April 29, 2007. The series was repeated on weekdays and Sunday from June to August 2007, and was not shown for the 2007-08 season. It is broadcast on Kix sky channel 627 from 12 June. From September 1, 2008, Teletoon is repeating the anime on weekdays. From November 2008 until September 2011, it was shown on the Cookie Jar Toons block on This TV.

Music

Japan
Opening Theme #1: "Alright" (eps. 1-26)
Opening Theme #2: "Brave Heart" by Saeko Chiba (eps. 27-52)
Ending Theme #1: "Twilight Time" by MCU (eps. 1-13)
Ending Theme #2: "Koi no Keshiki" by Tamaru Yamada (eps. 14-26)
Ending Theme #3: "Towards a Dream" by Takashi Kondo and Sanae Kobayashi (eps. 27-52)

North America
Opening Theme: "Calling All Spider Riders" Theme song words and music by Grayson Matthews Audio (Elizabeth Taylor, David Borbara, Tom Westin, Jason Gleed); performed by Jason Gleed, Jason Dantes Balde "Clip", and Annelise Noronha.

South America
Opening Theme: ¡Vengan Ya, Spider Riders! (Spanish version of the North American opening) adapted and sung by Jorge Bringas
Ending Theme: Calling All Spider Riders (short instrumental version)

Crew

English crew
 David Shaw - Music Score
 Melodie Vaughan - Voice Director

Web manga
On May 31, 2006, the Spider Riders manga premiered at TV Tokyo's ani.tv website, illustrated by Junji Ohno of Studio 23. The seventh and final volume was published between 2006-11-29 and 2006-12-27. Previous volumes were removed on 2006-11-29.

Starting on December 27, 2006, the manga was republished under the Monthly Fang Comic site, when two more chapters of the manga were later released. The web comic was first published in paper form on June 19, 2007, by the Monthly Fang Comic publisher LEED Publishing Co., Ltd.; the online chapters were removed soon after. Currently, the manga is not available.

The web manga has an alternate beginning, where Hunter Steele enters a spider-shaped monument and discovers the manacle floating above a spider web. Hunter wears the manacle when it flies to his hand and falls into Inner World through a gap between web strings. Inside the Inner World, Hunter discovers Shadow after peeking at the bathing Corona and after trying to rescue a cart of caged humans. Each chapter of the web manga ends with the Sparkling Sparkle section, following the adventures of Princess Sparkle and Hortala in a 4-square manga format.

In the Boy's Fang manga version, certain scenes are re-edited; for example, Corona is now naked instead of in underwear when Hunter first met her in chapter 1, an illustration is added at the beginning of each chapter, and Sparkling Sparkle segments have been removed.

Tie-in media

Web games
Tribal Nova produced a tie-in online game based on the show, available on the official site.

Phone games
On July 29, 2006, the Anime X site published Spider Catcher and Oracle Daifugo, downloadable phone games based on the show for the FOMA-enabled cell phones. A third game, Jumping Spider, was released on August 9, 2006. Each game cost 105 yen.

References

External links

  (former official site: now hosted as fansite)
 Spider Riders at Bee Train
 Spider Riders  at TV Tokyo
 
 

Book series introduced in 2004
Science fiction book series
2006 manga
This TV
Kids' WB original shows
2000s Canadian animated television series
2000s Canadian science fiction television series
2006 Canadian television series debuts
2007 Canadian television series endings
English-language television shows
Television series about spiders
Fictional spiders
Bee Train Production
Funimation
Television series by Cookie Jar Entertainment
Television shows written by Yōsuke Kuroda
TV Tokyo original programming
Teletoon original programming
Canadian children's animated action television series
Canadian children's animated adventure television series
Canadian children's animated science fantasy television series
Japanese children's animated action television series
Japanese children's animated adventure television series
Japanese children's animated science fantasy television series
Animated television series about children
Anime-influenced Western animated television series